Briddy Alejandra Velasco Martín (born 23 August 1985) is a Colombian footballer who played as a goalkeeper for the Colombia women's national football team. She was part of the team at the 2011 FIFA Women's World Cup. At the club level, she played for Club Deportivo Gol Star in Colombia.

References

External links
 
 

1985 births
Living people
Women's association football goalkeepers
Colombian women's footballers
Place of birth missing (living people)
Colombia women's international footballers
2011 FIFA Women's World Cup players
21st-century Colombian women